Reggae is a popular musical genre.

Reggae may also refer to:

Reggae (album), a 1973 album by Herbie Mann
Reggae, a Mega Man character

See also
Reggae Reggae Sauce